Eurowings Europe are two low-cost airlines registered in Austria and Malta. They are a subsidiary of Lufthansa and sister companies of the German Eurowings.

History
In January 2016, ch-aviation reported that Eurowings Europe expected to start operations in the middle of the year, operating routes throughout the continent from an initial base at Vienna. About a week after obtaining its air operator's certificate from the Austrian civil aviation authorities, Eurowings Europe departed Vienna for Alicante on 23 June 2016, its maiden flight. It has adopted the corporate identity of its German sister airline, Eurowings.

In September 2019, Lufthansa Group announced, that Austrian Airlines will lease four Vienna-based Airbus A320-200 from Eurowings Europe starting January 2020. The airline will also take over some of Austrian Airlines' flights from Salzburg Airport and Innsbruck Airport. The Austrian Airlines wetlease contract for four aircraft in Vienna was withdrawn in April 2020 due to the Covid-19 pandemic.

In October 2019, Eurowings Europe took over the base in Pristina from its sister airline Germanwings.

In June 2021 it was announced that Eurowings Europe would expand its European network with the opening of a new base in Prague Airport starting October 2021 with two aircraft based for the winter season and three for the summer. Destinations would include European cities in the likes of Barcelona and Milan and holiday destinations such as the Balearics, Canaries and Tel Aviv.

In July 2022 it was announced that Eurowings Europe Gmbh would leave its Austrian registration and it would register in Malta and be renamed as Eurowings Europe Ltd.

Destinations
Eurowings Europe operates regional flights throughout Europe. As of 2022, it maintains six bases in Vienna, Salzburg, Palma de Mallorca, Prague, Stockholm Arlanda and Pristina. As of 2022 base Vienna is only a crew base and no aircraft are stationd there. In December 2022, Graz was announced as a summer base in which Eurowings will station one aircraft.

Fleet

, Eurowings Europe operates the following aircraft:

References

External links

Defunct airlines of Austria
Airlines established in 2016
Airlines disestablished in 2022
Airlines of Malta
Airlines established in 2022
2016 establishments in Austria
2022 disestablishments in Austria
2022 establishments in Malta
Lufthansa
Low-cost carriers